An election was held on November 4, 2014 to elect all 100 members to Montana's House of Representatives. The election coincided with elections for other offices, including U.S. Senate, U.S. House of Representatives and State Senate. The primary election was held on June 3, 2014.

Republicans retained control of the House despite a net loss of two seats, winning 59 seats compared to 
41 seats for the Democrats.

Results

Statewide
Statewide results of the 2014 Montana House of Representatives election:

District
Results of the 2014 Montana House of Representatives election by district:

References

House of Representatives
Montana House of Representatives
2014